Whistle Inn is a halt on the Pontypool and Blaenavon Railway heritage railway in Torfaen, Wales. It is situated adjacent to the Whistle Inn, near the village of Garn-yr-erw.

History

The station is situated on the trackbed of the London and North Western Railway's Brynmawr and Blaenavon Railway which closed to passengers on 5 May 1941 and to goods on 23 June 1954. The relaid section came into use in March 1972 and carried approximately 1000 tons of coal per day until June 1975 when the mine workings ceased and the line was clipped out of use on 18 August. The Private Siding Agreement concluded by the Coal Board for the reinstatement of the section was not terminated until 30 April 1980, after which the track was removed. A section from Cwmbran to Big Pit, Blaenavon was subsequently sold to the Pontypool and Blaenavon Railway.

Steam workings on the Pontypool and Blaenavon commenced on 11 August 1984 and a station was opened at Whistle Inn on 30 April 1988.

References

Notes

Sources

External links
 

Heritage railway stations in Torfaen
Railway stations in Great Britain opened in 1988
Railway stations built for UK heritage railways